The 1981 Wichita State Shockers football team was an American football team that represented  Wichita State as a member of the Missouri Valley Conference during the 1981 NCAA Division I-A football season. In their third year under head coach Willie Jeffries, the team compiled a 4–6–1 record.

Schedule

References

Wichita State
Wichita State Shockers football seasons
Wichita State Shockers football